Nicholas Arnold (1600–1665) was a Welsh gentleman landowner who sat in the House of Commons between 1626 and 1629.

Arnold was the son of John Arnold of Llanthony. He matriculated at St Alban Hall, Oxford, on 29 November 1616 aged sixteen.

In 1626, Arnold was elected Member of Parliament for Monmouthshire. He was re-elected as member for Monmouthshire in 1628 and held his seat until 1629, when King Charles decided to rule without parliament for eleven years. He was High Sheriff of Monmouthshire in 1633.

Arnold married Margaret Evan, daughter of John Evan of Dorset.

References

1600 births
1665 deaths
Members of the Parliament of England (pre-1707) for constituencies in Wales
English MPs 1626
English MPs 1628–1629
Alumni of St Alban Hall, Oxford
High Sheriffs of Monmouthshire